Tanner Fountain is a fountain on the Stanford University campus in Stanford, California, United States. Located between Hoover Tower and Memorial Auditorium, the fountain was installed in 1977, having been donated by Obert Tanner and his wife to commemorate their son. The couple was planning to fund the project since 1972, and installation and landscaping cost less than $250,000.

References

1977 establishments in California
Buildings and structures completed in 1977
Fountains in California
Stanford University buildings and structures